K. Uma Rama Rao ( born Uma Maheshwari on 4 July 1938 – 27 August 2016)   was an Indian Kuchipudi dancer, choreographer, research scholar, author and dance teacher. She was also the Founder & Director of Lasya Priya Dance Academy, established in 1985 in Hyderabad, India.
 
In 2003, she was awarded the Sangeet Natak Akademi Award for proficiency in Kuchipudi by India's National Academy for Music, Dance and Drama. She is a recipient of the National Senior Fellowship bestowed by the Department of Culture, Government of India through the Sangeet Natak Akademi.

Early life and education

She was born on 4 July 1938 as "Uma Maheswari" to Dr. V. V.Krishna Rao and Sowbhagyam in a 'Vaddadi' family from Visakhapatnam in Andhra Pradesh. Encouraged by her family, that has a background of distinguished scholars with a keen interest in literature, music and dance, she started training in dance from the age of 5 years from gurus like Acharya P.V. Narasimha Rao, Padmasri Dr. Nataraja Rama Krishna, Brahmasri Vedantam Lakshmi Narayana Sastri, Guru Pakkiriswami Pillai and Guru C.R. Acharya in Kuchipudi, Bharata Natyam and ritual dance traditions. She became proficient in theoretical and practical aspects of these ancient traditional art forms.
In her early years, along with her sister Sumathy Kaushal, she performed on various occasions in several places under the personal guidance of her gurus. During this period 1953 and 55, she passed examinations in Classical Music and Dance, conducted by the then Madras Government. Later with the blessings of her guru mainly, Dr. Nataraja Rama Krishna. she had taken up teaching to pass on this tradition to younger generation.

She was a post graduate in Economics from Osmania University, Hyderabad.

Performances
Uma choreographed a number of solo items, dance features, dance dramas and traditional Yakshaganas, based on the lyrics of great composers of yester years and contemporary writers of today, with innovative spirit, which brought her laurels. Her motto is to bring out old traditional literary gems to lime light and give them a new outlook, without deviating from the original traditional structure with their aesthetic, philosophical and spiritual values. To mention a few traditional plays Sri Thyagaraja's Nauka Charitra, Prahlada Bhakti Vijayam, King Shahaji's Sankara and Vishnu Pallaki Seva prabandhams, Vighneswara Kalyanam, Narayana Theertha's Sadhvi Rukmini, Matrubhutayya's Parijatapaharanam, Kakuturi Padmavati's Mandakini and Siva Katyayani dance features like Viswadeepam, Pancha Nadeeyam, Swara raga Nartanam of Padma Bhushan Dr. C. Narayana reddy, Telugu Velugulu, Medha, Medha Vikas on computers, which showed her multifaceted choreographic talent and her scholarly knowledge in the subject.

Teaching career
With this background, she served Sri Tyagaraja Government college of music and Dance in Hyderabad as a Senior Lecturer in Dance from 1969 to 1988 and trained students in certificate, Diploma and Degree courses in Bharata Natyam. Consequently, she had taken up the responsibility of heading the Department of Dance in the capacity of Associate Professor in Potti Sreeramulu Telugu University, Hyderabad.

To guide art students for research and other activities in the Dance field, she had submitted her thesis on 'Yakshagana Prabandhas of King Shahaji-11 ' -(a Maharashtrian who ruled Thanjavur from 1684 to 1712 A.D and composed 20 Yakshaganas -dance dramas in Telugu language )to Telugu University and obtained PhD degree along with a gold medal in 1994.

Some of her famous disciples are, Dr. Alekhya Punjala (HOD of Dance Department at Telugu University), Jyothi Lakkaraju, Madhuri Kishore, Padma Chebrolu, Pallavi Kumar, Phani Jayanthi Sen many more.

Lasya Priya Dance Academy
She established Lasya Priya, a dance institution in Hyderabad, Andhra Pradesh, in 1985, which imparts training in Kuchipudi and Bharata Natyam classical dance traditions in theoretical and practical aspects and prepares them for different levels of State Government and University examinations. Lasya Priya is an affiliated study center of Indira Gandhi National Open University.

Awards and honours
She received many awards and Honours in recognition of her dedication, commitment and service towards art of Dance. Worth mentioning are

 Kala Neerajanam from Government of Andhra Pradesh.
 Best Teacher award from Government of Andhra Pradesh.
 Sri Kala Poorna from Saint Annamacharya project of North America (SAPNA).
 Pratibha Puraskar from Potti Sreeramulu Telugu University, Hyderabad.
 Sangeet Natak Academi from the hands of Sri Kalam, the President of India on 26 October 2004 at Vigyan Bhavan, New Delhi

Works

 Kuchipudi Bharatam of Kuchipudi Dance: South Indian Classical Dance Tradition. Sri Satguru Publications, 1992. .

Lately Dr. Uma Rama Rao attended the Historic 2nd International Kuchipudi Dance Convention on 24, 25, 26 December 2010 at HICC and G. M. C. Balayogi Athletic Stadium Hyderabad, where around 2,800 Kuchipudi Dancers, including 200+ Natya Gurus made Guinness Book of World Records. Her presence made a blessing event, she directly inspired, encouraged and blessed many students to let long live the cultural dance Kuchipudi.

References

External links

 Lasya Priya Dance Academy, website
 Ishana Samhita
 SAPNA
 SiliconAndhra

Kuchipudi exponents
1938 births
2016 deaths
Artists from Visakhapatnam
Indian dance teachers
Recipients of the Sangeet Natak Akademi Award
Osmania University alumni
Performers of Indian classical dance
Indian classical choreographers
Dancers from Andhra Pradesh
Indian female classical dancers
Indian women choreographers
Indian choreographers
Women educators from Andhra Pradesh
20th-century Indian dancers
20th-century Indian women artists
Educators from Andhra Pradesh
Women artists from Andhra Pradesh
20th-century Indian educators
20th-century women educators